The Belmont Bruins baseball team (formerly the Belmont Rebels) is a varsity intercollegiate athletic team of Belmont University in Nashville, Tennessee, United States. The team is a member of the Missouri Valley Conference, which is part of the National Collegiate Athletic Association's Division I. The team plays its home games at E. S. Rose Park in Nashville. The Bruins are coached by Dave Jarvis.

Year-by-year results

Major League Baseball
Belmont has had 26 Major League Baseball draft selections since the draft began in 1965. The only players from Belmont to go on to play in the majors are Jerry Bell, Dwight Bernard, and Matt Beaty.

See also
List of NCAA Division I baseball programs

References

External links